Levy is an unincorporated community located in the southern portions of Jasper County, South Carolina, United States. Levy is accessible via South Carolina Highway 315 and used to be served by the now-abandoned Seaboard Air Line Charleston Subdivision. Levy is 13 feet in elevation and is in the Eastern Time Zone (UTC -5 hours).

References

Populated places in Jasper County, South Carolina
Hilton Head Island–Beaufort micropolitan area